Stephenson Glacier is a glacier close west of Dovers Moraine on the east side of Heard Island in the southern Indian Ocean. Its terminus is between Dovers Moraine and Stephenson Lagoon, with part of the glacier flowing to Doppler Hill and Sealers Beach. To the north of Stephenson Glacier is Brown Glacier, whose terminus is located at Brown Lagoon. To the southwest of Stephenson Glacier is Winston Glacier, whose terminus is located at Winston Lagoon, between Cape Lockyer and Oatt Rocks.

Discovery and naming
Stephenson Glacier was surveyed by ANARE (Australian National Antarctic Research Expeditions) in 1948. It was named by Antarctic Names Committee of Australia (ANCA) for P.J. Stephenson, ANARE geologist on Heard Island in 1963.

References

Further reading

External links
Click here to see a map of Heard Island and McDonald Islands, including all major topographical features
Australian Antarctic Division
Australian Antarctic Gazetteer
Composite Gazetteer of Antarctica
Australian Antarctic Names and Medals Committee (AANMC)
United States Geological Survey, Geographic Names Information System (GNIS)
Scientific Committee on Antarctic Research (SCAR)

Glaciers of Heard Island and McDonald Islands